This is a list of Billboard magazine's top popular songs of 1953 by retail sales.

See also
1953 in music
List of number-one singles of 1953 (U.S.)

References

1953 record charts
Billboard charts